Shirin polo, also commonly known as Persian wedding rice or Rosh Hashanah rice, is a traditional Persian rice pilaf that is commonly served to mark special occasions such as weddings. It is a simplified version of morassa' polō, .

In the Persian Jewish community worldwide, it is often associated with holidays such as Purim, Pesach, Rosh Hashanah and the high holidays. It is served as iftar during Ramadan.

Overview

Shirin polo is typically served at celebrations such as weddings, birthdays, and holidays. It is steamed rice in the Persian style topped with nuts and dried fruits such as barberries, apricots, and dates.

Preparation

Shirin polo is typically prepared in the usual Persian way: soaking and boiling, then draining and steaming after mixing it with cooking oil, saffron or turmeric, and other spices and seasoning. Sometimes it is prepared with a crispy crust, tahdig. When it is cooked, it is unmoulded onto a serving platter with tahdig as a garnish. It is then topped with dried fruits, such as apricots, barberries, dates, prunes, and nuts such as pistachio, almond, walnut, or hazelnuts, and sometimes orange peel. The dried fruits and nuts may be left whole or chopped.

Serving

Shirin polo is often served with spiced baked chicken.

See also
 List of rice dishes

References

Iranian cuisine
Mizrahi Jewish cuisine
Persian Jewish cuisine
Rice dishes
Iftar foods